Alosternida chalybaea is a species of beetle in the family Cerambycidae, the only species in the genus Alosternida.

References

Lepturinae